Fame L.A. is an American drama series that aired in syndication from 1997 to 1998.  It told the story of a drama/dance school in Los Angeles where students honed their talents while overcoming various personal problems.  It starred Heidi Noelle Lenhart, Christian Kane, Roselyn Sanchez, William R. Moses, and Lesli Margherita, among others. Its producers included Patricia Green.  Among its directors were Sharron Miller and Nancy Malone. A total of 22 sixty-minute episodes were produced. Raidió Teilifís Éireann, Ireland's national public service broadcaster, is currently airing their own version of the show, titled, Fame: The Musical.

Cast
 William R. Moses  as David Graysmark
 Heidi Noelle Lenhart as Suzanne Carson
 Roselyn Sanchez as Lili Arguelo
 Christian Kane as Ryan Legget
 Matt Winston as Adom Lewis
 Lesli Margherita as Liz Clark
 Andy Milder as Marcus Carilli
 T.E. Russell as T.J. Baron

Episodes

Awards
The series won two Primetime Emmys, for Outstanding Choreography (Marguerite Pomerhn Derricks and Peggy Holmes for the pilot) and Outstanding Main Title Theme Music (Maribeth Derry, Tom Snow, Robbie Buchanan and series creator Richard Barton Lewis).

References

External links
 

1990s American drama television series
1997 American television series debuts
1998 American television series endings
Primetime Emmy Award-winning television series
First-run syndicated television programs in the United States
Television series by MGM Television
Television shows set in Los Angeles
English-language television shows
Fame (franchise)